Harold Franklin Steele (March 9, 1905 – December 3, 1992) was a Canadian ice hockey right winger who played in one National Hockey League game for the Detroit Falcons during the 1930–31 NHL season. He played on December 25, 1930 against the Toronto Maple Leafs, recording 2 penalty minutes. The rest of his career, which lasted from 1927 to 1940, was spent in the minor leagues, primarily in the International Hockey League. Steele died in Hollywood, Florida in 1992.

Career statistics

Regular season and playoffs

See also
List of players who played only one game in the NHL

References

Bibliography

External links

1905 births
1992 deaths
Canadian expatriate ice hockey players in the United States
Canadian ice hockey right wingers
Detroit Falcons players
Detroit Olympics (IHL) players
Ice hockey people from Ontario
Kansas City Pla-Mors players
Sportspeople from Niagara Falls, Ontario
Windsor Bulldogs (1929–1936) players